Brad Walker (born June 21, 1981 in Aberdeen, South Dakota) is an American pole vaulter.  He was the American recordholder and was the 2007 World Champion in the event.

High school
Walker attended University High School in Spokane Valley, Washington and competed in football, basketball, and track and field. In track, Walker was coached by Reg Hulbert and won All-Greater Spokane League honors following his senior season. Walker graduated from University High School in 1999 with a 3.89 GPA.

Collegiate and professional career
Walker attended the University of Washington, where he was a member of Phi Gamma Delta fraternity.  While there, he became NCAA indoor pole vault champion twice and four-time NCAA All-American under Coach Pat Licari. In 2005 he became both indoor and outdoor National Champion.

Perhaps not among the favorites in the 2005 World Championships, Walker nonetheless won the silver medal with 5.75. Two weeks later in Rieti he set a new personal best of 5.96. In 2006 he won the World Indoor Championships in Moscow with a jump of 5.80meters. In July 2006, at Jockgrim, Germany, Brad Walker, cleared 6 meters, the best performance of the year, in a pole vault competition. He won the gold in the world championships on 1 September 2007.  On 8 June 2008 Walker jumped in Eugene to a new personal and American record with 6.04. Walker qualified for the 2008 Olympics, but failed to clear a height in the preliminary rounds.

Walker retained his US championship title in 2009, even though his status as reigning World Champion gave him a bye into the 2009 World Championships in Athletics.

At the 2012 Summer Olympics, Walker reached the final but finished 12th with a 5.50m vault.

See also

6 metres club

References

External links
 
 
 
 
 
 Flotrack.com Video Interview of Brad Walker during the 100th Millrose Games

1981 births
Living people
American male pole vaulters
People from Aberdeen, South Dakota
Olympic track and field athletes of the United States
Athletes (track and field) at the 2008 Summer Olympics
Athletes (track and field) at the 2012 Summer Olympics
University of Washington alumni
World Athletics Championships medalists
World Athletics Championships athletes for the United States
USA Outdoor Track and Field Championships winners
USA Indoor Track and Field Championships winners
World Athletics Indoor Championships winners
World Athletics Championships winners